The 2012–13 First Women's Basketball League of Serbia is the 7th season of the First Women's Basketball League of Serbia, the highest professional basketball league in Serbia. It is also 69th national championship played by Serbian clubs inclusive of nation's previous incarnations as Yugoslavia and Serbia & Montenegro.

The first half of the season consists of 11 teams and 110-game regular season (20 games for each of the 11 teams) began on 6 October 2012 and will end on 17 February  2013. The second part of the season consists of two parts, the Play Off and Play Out. 

In the Play Off playing eight teams, 5 from Adriatic League and 3 from First Women's Basketball League of Serbia. In the Play Out playing six teams it turns out that the last team. After the regular season it turns the bottom team and one team in Play Out. Play Off is played from 10. March 2013. to 6. April 2013, Play Out is played from 5. - 30. March 2013. Champion for this season is Partizan.

Team information

Regular season
The League of the season was played with 11 teams and play a dual circuit system, each with each one game at home and away. The four best teams at the end of the regular season were placed in the Play Off. The regular season began on 6 October 2012 and it will end on 17 February 2013.

Play Off
Play Off is played according to the cup system. Champion is received after the final was played. The final was played on 3 wins, while in other parts the Play Off at 2 victory. Play Off is played from 10. March 2013. to 6. April 2013.

Play Out
In play out all the clubs play against each other, and the worst ranked team in play out is relegation of the league. Play Out is played from 5. - 30. March 2013.

Awards
Player of the Year: Tamara Radočaj (170-PG-87) of Partizan Galenika
Point Guard of the Year: Tamara Radočaj (170-PG-87) of Partizan Galenika
Shooting Guard of the Year: Jovana Popović (173-PG-90) of Vojvodina
Small Forward of the Year: Nataša Bučevac (179-G-85) of Vojvodina
Power Forward of the Year: Brooke Queenan (188-F-84) of Partizan Galenika
Center of the Year: Nikolina Milić (195-C-94) of Radnički Kragujevac
Coach of the Year: Marina Maljković of Partizan Galenika

1st Team
PG: Tamara Radočaj (170-PG-87) of Partizan Galenika
G: Jovana Popović (173-PG-90) of Vojvodina
F: Nataša Bučevac (179-G-85) of Vojvodina
PF: Brooke Queenan (188-F-84) of Partizan Galenika
C: Nikolina Milić (195-C-94) of Radnički Kragujevac

2nd Team
G: Snežana Čolić (178-G-92) of Radivoj Korać
G: Milica Dabović (175-PG-82) of Partizan Galenika
G: Nevena Jovanović (178-G-90) of Partizan Galenika
F/C: Ivana Grubor (185-F/C-84) of Jagodina 2001
F/C: Tina Jovanović (190-F/C-91) of Radivoj Korać

Honorable Mention
Aleksandra Stanaćev (167-PG-94) of Crvena zvezda
Katarina Vučković (191-F/C-94) of Crvena zvezda
Ivana Jovović (185-F-89) of Vrbas
Jovana Vidaković (171-PG-94) of Šabac
Jelena Prvulović (175-G-91) of Radnički Kragujevac
Marina Marković (181-G/F-91) of Šumadija Kragujevac
Bojana Janković (184-F-83) of Vršac
Dijana Stančić (182-G/F-93) of Stara Pazova
Marija Ilić (190-C-85) of Student Niš
Ivana Grubor (185-F/C-84) of Jagodina 2001
Sandra Bošković (171-F-91) of Vojvodina
Milena Radošević (173-G/F-87) of Srbobran
Marija Radošević of Čelarevo

References

External links
 First Basketball Women's League of Serbia at eurobasket.com
 Regular season at srbijasport.net
 Play Off at srbijasport.net
 Play Out at srbijasport.net

First Women's Basketball League of Serbia seasons
Serbia
women